The European Chamber of Commerce in Korea (ECCK) is a non-profit, non-political organization, established to support European businesses operating in or related to Korea. The primary objective of the Chamber is to provide its members with information, communication, and access pertaining to the business and regulatory environment of Korea.

ECCK's headquarter is located in Seoul, South Korea, and a chapter is located in Busan.

History 
By registering with the Ministry of Trade, Industry and Energy (South Korea), the ECCK was officially founded as a non-profit, non-political organization on December 3, 2012. The ECCK is not affiliated with any branch of the Korean government.

Structure 
Entrusted with member's mandate, the Board of Director presides over the organization. The Advisory Board embodies representatives of national chambers and embassies, providing general guidance and advice. The Secretariat functions to execute the ECCK's day-to-day activities and operations.

Board of Directors 
The Board of Directors consists of nine elected persons: Chairperson, Vice Chairperson, Director, Treasurer, and Trustee. The Board of Director is responsible for overseeing and making policy decisions for the ECCK.

Advisory board 
The Advisory Board consists of representatives of the business community of each Member State of the European Union or the European Free Trade Association. The Advisory Board meets on a quarterly basis.

Secretariat 
The Secretariat functions to execute the ECCK's day-to-day activities and operations.

Activities 
The ECCK provides expansive range of supporting programs and services. Through its various activities, the ECCK advocates for its members to advance and optimize their business opportunities in Korea.

Committees 
The Chamber has 16 Committees, covering various industries. Composed of participating member companies, Committees assist members to keep informed of regulations, to improve market intelligence, and to express positions on specific trade issues. The ECCK Committees are managed by Directors assigned by the ECCK, and Committee Chairpersons are elected by members.

Forums 
While Committees address industry-specific issues to Korean government counterparts, Forums focus primarily on cross-industry topics such as human resources or corporate social responsibilities. The ECCK Forums are held on a regular basis throughout the year.

Events 

The ECCK organizes conferences and seminars of industrial relevance for knowledge sharing. Formal and informal networking events are hosted to encourage information exchange and business relationships. Furthermore, the ECCK also functions as the first point of contact for European executives and officials coming to Korea.

Publications 
As a platform for information exchange, the ECCK circulates publications to inform members of the current market situation, key regulatory issues, and notable social trends in Korea. In addition, the Chamber conducts surveys on the business climate in Korea and interviews to gather industry-expert opinions.
 ECCK White Paper
 ECCK Membership Directory
 Business Confidence Survey
 ECCK Connect (quarterly magazine)
 Monthly Newsletter

Membership benefits 
 Access to timely information on Korea's regulatory environment, EU-Korea FTA implementation, and general business issues
 Insight into Korean political and economic context, access to best social networks in the country, and connections to heighten your business operation
 Updates on government policies, taxation, legislation, laws and regulations
 Representation of industry-specific issues to Korean government
 Informational exchange via networking and educational workshops

References

External links 
 

Chambers of commerce
Business in South Korea
Organizations related to the European Union
European Free Trade Association